Högbonden is a Swedish island and lighthouse located in the World Heritage Site Höga kusten. From springtime in May through October a hostel is open to visitors in the old lightkeeper's house. In the summer season there is regular daily boat service from Bönhamn to Högbonden. The whole island is a nature reserve.

History
The lighthouse was built after complaints that there were no lighthouses between Lungö and Skagsudde. It is the second-highest placed lighthouse in Sweden (after Kullen Lighthouse), and it was also one of the most powerful. In November 2010 the old lens was finally retired and the power source changed to solar cell-power. The light now consists of a small white light on the balcony's railing and the red and green sectors were removed. As of 2012 the tower is in bad condition and in need of repairs. It is owned by the Swedish Maritime Administration.

See also

 List of lighthouses and lightvessels in Sweden

References

External links
 Sjofartsverket  
 The Swedish Lighthouse Society

Islands of Västernorrland County
Lighthouses in Sweden
Buildings and structures in Västernorrland County